P.S.R. Law College is located in Turangi, Kakinada. Sri P.L.Narasimha Rao Patnaik is the founder and chairman of this college. Dr. B.Sangeetha is principal of this college.

References

External links
PSR Law College

Universities and colleges in Kakinada district
Education in Kakinada
Educational institutions in India with year of establishment missing
Colleges in Andhra Pradesh